Warren Scott (born 28 September 1971 in Bishop's Stortford, Hertfordshire) is a British race driver. He has previously competed in the British Touring Car Championship with his self-run Team BMR. He has also raced in the British Superbike Championship.

Racing career

British Superbike Championship

Scott rode a BMR Racing Kawasaki Ninja ZX-10R at the 2004 British Superbike Championship season, finishing 18th in the Privateers Cup standings.

British Touring Car Championship

Scott entered the BTCC in 2013 driving a Super 2000 SEAT León with which he was eligible for the Jack Sears Trophy He was unable to start the races at Croft due to a timing belt issue. For the second half of the season, Team BMR Restart and Team HARD. agreed a partnership that allowed Scott to switch to an NGTC Volkswagen CC from Snetterton onwards.

Scott was joined by former BTCC Champions Jason Plato and Colin Turkington plus Aron Smith in a foup in the 2015 British Touring Car Championship season.

British Rallycross Championship
Scott will drive an LD Motorsports-run Citroen DS3 Supercar at the 2017 British Rallycross Championship.

Racing record

Complete British Touring Car Championship results
(key) (Races in bold indicate pole position – 1 point awarded just in first race) (Races in italics indicate fastest lap – 1 point awarded all races) (* signifies that driver lead race for at least one lap – 1 point given all races)

References

External links
Profile from btcc.net

British Touring Car Championship drivers
British Superbike Championship riders
1971 births
Living people